Villamont is an unincorporated community in western Bedford County, Virginia, United States. Villamont is located along U.S. Route 460 between Blue Ridge and Montvale. It is part of the Lynchburg Metropolitan Statistical Area.

Geography

Government
Villamont had a post office until it closed on January 20, 2007. The ZIP Code for Villamont was 24178. Addresses within Villamont now use a Blue Ridge ZIP Code.

Law enforcement is provided by the Bedford County Sheriff's Office. Fire protection is provided by the Montvale Volunteer Fire Department. Emergency medical services are provided by the Montvale Volunteer Rescue Squad.

Education
The community is served by Bedford County Public Schools. Public school students residing in Villamont are zoned to attend Montvale Elementary School, Liberty Middle School, and Liberty High School. 

The closest higher education institutions to the community are located in nearby Bedford and Roanoke.

Transportation

Air
The Roanoke-Blacksburg Regional Airport is the closest airport with commercial service to the community.

Highways
 US Route 221
 US Route 460

Rail
A Norfolk Southern rail line runs through the community. The closest passenger rail service is located in Roanoke.

References

Unincorporated communities in Bedford County, Virginia
Unincorporated communities in Virginia